Industrijska četvrt is a city district of Osijek, Croatia. It has 6,920 inhabitants distributed in 2,000 households.

Day of the city district is on 1 May, on feast of Saint Joseph the Worker.

Its name in Croatian literally means "Industrial district".

References

External links
 

Districts of Osijek